Nupserha homeyeri is a species of beetle in the family Cerambycidae. It was described by Harold in 1879.

Varietas
 Nupserha homeyeri var. nebulosa Breuning, 1950
 Nupserha homeyeri var. borana Müller, 1943
 Nupserha homeyeri var. longulipennis Breuning, 1949
 Nupserha homeyeri var. unicoloripennis Breuning, 1950
 Nupserha homeyeri var. obscura Breuning, 1956
 Nupserha homeyeri var. postscutellaris Breuning, 1950
 Nupserha homeyeri var. latenigra Breuning, 1949

References

homeyeri
Beetles described in 1879